Sunes jul (Swedish for Sune's Christmas) was the 1991 SVT Christmas calendar. In 2004, it was later released to DVD. In 2007, it was voted the third best  ever in Aftonbladet. It is based on the books series about the boy Sune by Anders Jacobsson and Sören Olsson.

The series was viewed by over 3,000,000 viewers, which at the time was an all-time record for SVT's Christmas calendar.

Castlist
Andreas Hoffer as Karl Sune Rudolf Andersson
Anders Jacobsson as Speaker
Sören Olsson as Speaker
Peter Haber as Rudolf Andersson
Carina Lidbom as Karin Andersson
Gabriel Odenhammar as Håkan Andersson
Nina Almlöf as Anna Andersson
Rebecka Liljeberg as Sophie Blixt
Calle Torén as Sune's Friend
Anette Stenson-Fjordefalk as the lady teacher
Jimmy Karlsson as Jocke
Pär Ericson as the Principal
Måns Herngren as Staffan Stolledräng
Åke Lindström as Santa Claus

Episodes
 Julkortet (The Christmas Photography)
 Sophie! (Sophie!)
 Tjejgrej (Girly Thing)
 Hockeyklubban (The Hockey Stick)
 Skidvallan (The Ski Wax)
 Skrik- och gapsjukan (Shout- and Gape Disease)
 Partyt (The Party)
 Julbordet (The Christmas Dinner)
 Rollen (The Role)
 Julspelet (The Nativity Play)
 Varuhuset (The Department Store)
 Krig! (War!)
 Lucia (Saint Lucy)
 Julbaket (The Christmas Baking)
 Pulkapappa (Pulk Father)
 Julstädning (Christmas Cleaning)
 Farmor och farfar (Grandmother and Grandfather)
 Julgranen (The Christmas Tree)
 Julpynt (Christmas Decorations)
 Skolavslutningen (The Graduation)
 Julrim (Christmas Rhyme)
 I kyrkan (In Church)
 Dan-före-dan (The Day Before the Day)
 Julafton (Christmas Eve)

Recording
Recordings began in March 1991.

Home video
In 1992 the series was released to VHS with the title "Sunes vecka", with rereleases in 1993 and 1999, and in 2002 it was released to DVD in two parts, with volume 1 in a red box and volume 2 in a green box. The film Sune's Summer was released to DVD on 20 October 2004, and in 2008 a DVD with both "Sunes jul" and "Sune's Summer was released", with both volumes on the same edition.

Episode 20; Skolavslutning, is not on any DVD edition.

Home video releases

References

External links

The series at SVT's open archive
Sören Olsson about Sunes jul at SVT*s open archive blog

1991 Swedish television series debuts
1991 Swedish television series endings
Sveriges Television's Christmas calendar
Television shows based on children's books
1990s Swedish television series
Television shows set in Sweden